Sahlabad (also Romanized as Sahlābād) is a village in Abarj Rural District, Dorudzan District, Marvdasht County, Fars Province, Iran. At the 2006 census, its population was 262, in 49 families.

References 

Populated places in Marvdasht County